The Lesotho National Olympic Committee (IOC code: LES) is the National Olympic Committee representing Lesotho. It was created in 1971 and officially recognised by the International Olympic Committee in 1972.

Presidents of Committee
 2009–present – Matlohang Moiloa-Ramoqopo

See also
Lesotho at the Olympics
Lesotho at the Commonwealth Games

References

Lesotho
Lesotho
Lesotho at the Olympics
Sports governing bodies in Lesotho
1972 establishments in Lesotho

Sports organizations established in 1972